Brusly is a town in West Baton Rouge Parish, Louisiana, United States. The population was 2,589 at the 2010 census. It is part of the Baton Rouge Metropolitan Statistical Area.

History 
The town was established in 1901. Its Brusly High School bears the nickname, the Panthers. Its colors are red, white and black. Newly elected State Representative Edmond Jordan graduated from Brusly High School in 1989.

Historic Cinclare Sugar Mill is located on LA Highway 1.

Geography
Brusly is located at  (30.390470, -91.241797).

Demographics

As of the 2020 United States census, there were 2,578 people, 1,033 households, and 764 families residing in the town, reflecting an increase since the 2000 census.

As of the census of 2000, there were 2,020 people, 749 households, and 587 families residing in the town. The racial makeup of the town was 72.77% Caucasian, 25.74% African American, 0.15% Native American, 0.15% Asian, 0.15% Pacific Islander, 0.25% from other races, and 0.79% from two or more races. Hispanic or Latino of any race were 0.89% of the population.

There were 749 households, out of which 36.8% had children under the age of 18 living with them, 59.5% were married couples living together, 15.1% had a female householder with no husband present, and 21.5% were non-families. 19.2% of all households were made up of individuals, and 8.9% had someone living alone who was 65 years of age or older. The average household size was 2.70 and the average family size was 3.09.

In the town, the population was spread out, with 26.4% under the age of 18, 9.1% from 18 to 24, 27.1% from 25 to 44, 26.4% from 45 to 64, and 11.0% who were 65 years of age or older. The median age was 36 years. For every 100 females, there were 92.4 males. For every 100 women age 18 and over, there were 88.2 men.

The median income for a household in the town was $47,619, and the median income for a family was $55,100. Males had a median income of $37,330 versus $25,719 for females. The per capita income for the town was $18,060. About 5.9% of families and 6.7% of the population were below the poverty line, including 8.0% of those under age 18 and 13.5% of those age 65 or over.

Government
The town maintains a police department.

Notable people
Amie Comeaux - country music artist
Randall Gay - National Football League cornerback
Edmond Jordan - lawyer and state representative since May 2016
William S. Patout, III, Iberia Parish sugar grower; resided in Brusly in the early 1960s.
Charles P. Adams - founding president of Grambling State University was born in Brusly.

References

External links
Town of Brusly - Official site.

Towns in Louisiana
Louisiana populated places on the Mississippi River
Towns in West Baton Rouge Parish, Louisiana
Towns in Baton Rouge metropolitan area